Krishnasamudram is a census town in Tiruchirappalli district in the Indian state of Tamil Nadu.

Demographics
 India census, Krishnasamudram had a population of 9254. Males constitute 51% of the population and females 49%. Krishnasamudram has an average literacy rate of 84%, higher than the national average of 59.5%: male literacy is 87%, and female literacy is 80%. In Krishnasamudram, 8% of the population is under 6 years of age.

References

Cities and towns in Tiruchirappalli district